Katong laksa is a variant of laksa lemak inspired by the Peranakans who live in the precinct of Katong in Singapore. It has an orangey-yellow colour spicy soup stock, flavoured with coconut milk and dried shrimp, topped with ingredients like cockles, prawns and fishcake. The noodles are normally cut up into smaller pieces so that the entire dish can be eaten with a spoon alone, without chopsticks or a fork.

Origin
The term "laksa" may have derived from the Chinese word 辣沙 (Cantonese: [làːt.sáː]), meaning "spicy sand" due to the ground dried prawns which give a sandy or gritty texture to the sauce. The name "katong" was used to refer to an exotic species of sea turtle that has since gone extinct. It can also mean the rippling effect of the sea mirage when looking at a shoreline. Katong is a residential precinct located in the estate of Marine Parade in central Singapore. Katong laksa was so named due to its origins in the area.

The dish was first popularised by brothers Ng Juat Swee and Ng Chwee Seng, who started selling the noodles in a coffee shop along East Coast Road in 1963. Four rivals had popped up along the same stretch of East Coast Road by 1999, and many of them had names with “Katong laksa” in it.

See also 
Singaporean cuisine
List of noodle dishes
Katong
Rice noodles

References

Singaporean noodle dishes